Northumbrian may refer to:

Languages 
 present-day Northumbrian dialect, a variant of Northern English closely related to Scots
 historic Northumbrian Old English, a variety of Old English spoken in the Kingdom of Northumbria

People 
 an inhabitant of the present-day region of Northumbria or North East England
 an inhabitant of the historic county of Northumberland specifically
 an inhabitant of the historic Kingdom of Northumbria

Transport
 Northumbrian (locomotive), a locomotive built in 1830 and first to encompass smokebox and firebox within the boiler barrel

Northumbria